Berdeniella is a genus of drain flies in the subfamily Psychodinae.

Species
Species within this genus include:

 Berdeniella alemannica
 Berdeniella alpina
 Berdeniella badukina
 Berdeniella belmontica
 Berdeniella betrandi
 Berdeniella bistricana
 Berdeniella bodoni
 Berdeniella boreonica
 Berdeniella brauxica
 Berdeniella bucegica
 Berdeniella calabricana
 Berdeniella cambuerina
 Berdeniella caprai
 Berdeniella carinthiaca
 Berdeniella caucasica
 Berdeniella chvojkai
 Berdeniella desnensis
 Berdeniella dispar
 Berdeniella elkeae
 Berdeniella fedilae
 Berdeniella freyi
 Berdeniella gardinii
 Berdeniella gereckei
 Berdeniella glacialis
 Berdeniella globulifera
 Berdeniella graeca
 Berdeniella granulosa
 Berdeniella gredosica
 Berdeniella hashemii
 Berdeniella helvetica
 Berdeniella hovassei
 Berdeniella huescana
 Berdeniella illiesi
 Berdeniella incisa
 Berdeniella jahoriensis
 Berdeniella jaramensis
 Berdeniella jezeki
 Berdeniella julianensis
 Berdeniella kocii
 Berdeniella longispinosa
 Berdeniella lucasii
 Berdeniella lucasioides
 Berdeniella magniseta
 Berdeniella manicata
 Berdeniella matthesi
 Berdeniella nevadensis
 Berdeniella nivalis
 Berdeniella ordesica
 Berdeniella pyrenaica
 Berdeniella ramosa
 Berdeniella salamannai
 Berdeniella sardoa
 Berdeniella schumpkanica
 Berdeniella sievecki
 Berdeniella stavniensis
 Berdeniella thermalis
 Berdeniella thomasi
 Berdeniella tuberosa
 Berdeniella unispinosa
 Berdeniella vaillanti
 Berdeniella vanosica
 Berdeniella vimmeri
 Berdeniella zoiai
 Berdeniella zwicki

References

Psychodidae
Psychodomorpha genera